The Maldives Monetary Authority (MMA) is the central bank of the republic of Maldives and was established on July 1, 1981, under the mandate provided by the "MMA Act" of 1981, located in the capital city of Malé. The current governor and chairperson is Ali Hashim and deputy governor is Mr. Ahmed Imad. It is a member of the Asian Clearing Union.

Its primary functions are to issue currency, regulate the availability of Maldivian rufiyaa (MVR), promote its stability, manage licenses, supervise and regulate institutions in the financial sector, formulate and implement monetary policy and to advise the government on issues relating to the economy and financial systems.

The MMA is a member of the Alliance for Financial Inclusion and is active in developing financial inclusion policy.

Governors
 Maumoon Abdul Gayoom, July 1981 - August 2004
 Mohamed Jaleel, September 2004 - July 2005
 Qasim Ibrahim, August 2005 - April 2007
 Abdulla Jihad, August 2007 - July 2008
 Fazeel Najeeb, October 2008 - December 2013
 Azeema Adam, April 2014 - August 2017
 Ahmed Naseer, August 2017 - July 2019
 Ali Hashim, 2019 - present

References

External links

Maldives Monetary Authority official site

Government of the Maldives
Economy of the Maldives
Maldives
1981 establishments in the Maldives
Banks established in 1981